Tarzan's Magic Fountain is a 1949 Tarzan film directed by Lee Sholem and starring Lex Barker as Tarzan and Brenda Joyce as his companion Jane.  The film also features Albert Dekker and Evelyn Ankers. It was co-written by Curt Siodmak.

This was Barker's first appearance as Edgar Rice Burroughs' ape-man, while Joyce had played Jane opposite Johnny Weissmuller as Tarzan in four previous films. She was one of only two actresses to portray Jane in movies with two different actors as Tarzan. (The other was Karla Schramm in the silent era.) Tarzan's Magic Fountain was Joyce's final turn in the role, and different actresses played Jane in each of Barker's four subsequent Tarzan movies: (Vanessa Brown, Virginia Huston, Dorothy Hart, and Joyce MacKenzie). Elmo Lincoln, who had been the first screen Tarzan three decades earlier, appears uncredited as a fisherman repairing his nets.

Plot
Aviator Gloria James Jessup went missing twenty years ago. Tarzan and Jane hear news of a man back in the United States who is about to be sentenced to life imprisonment; the only way he can be cleared is for Jessup's testimony. Tarzan secretly leaves for the hidden valley where Jessup has secretly been living for almost two decades and brings her back to testify.

Jessup looks decades younger than her actual age and this prompts a pair of men to ponder the rumor of a magic Fountain of Youth and try to find it after she returns from testifying and heads back there.

Cast
 Lex Barker as Tarzan
 Brenda Joyce as Jane
 Albert Dekker as Mr. Trask
 Evelyn Ankers as Gloria James Jessup
 Charles Drake as Mr. Dodd
 Alan Napier as Douglas Jessup
 Ted Hecht as Pasco
 Henry Brandon as Siko
 Elmo Lincoln as a Fisherman
 Henry Kulky a Vredak 
 Rory Mallinson as Vredak's Companion 
 Rick Vallin as the Flaming Arrow Shooter

Critical reception
The New York Times welcomed Lex Barker's new Tarzan as "A younger, more streamlined apeman with a personable grin and a torso guaranteed to make any lion cringe, he seems to be just what the witch-doctor ordered for this tattered series. The picture, though, is a matter of stale peanuts at the same old jungle stand. Instead of resorting to new ideas and treatment and a timely overhauling job, the studio has dragged out a mouldy script, the same sheepish-looking extras, and the wheezing chimpanzee, Cheetah, who isn't getting any younger, either."

References

External links

1949 films
1940s fantasy adventure films
American fantasy adventure films
American black-and-white films
American sequel films
American aviation films
Films based on European myths and legends
Films directed by Lee Sholem
Films with screenplays by Curt Siodmak
Films produced by Sol Lesser
1940s English-language films
1940s American films